Donuca is a genus of moths of the family Noctuidae. The genus was erected by Francis Walker in 1865.

Species
 Donuca castalia (Fabricius, 1775)
 Donuca lanipes (Butler, 1877)
 Donuca orbigera (Guenée, 1852)
 Donuca rubropicta (Butler, 1874)
 Donuca spectabilis Walker, 1865
 Donuca xanthopyga (Turner, 1909)

References

Catocalinae